The Medway scene consists of the bands and related cultural activities of the Medway Towns, north Kent, England. Main towns involved (from West to East) are Strood, Rochester, Chatham, Gillingham, and Rainham. The Medway scene is typically dated from the punk era of the late 1970s, when the presence of the Medway College of Design (later Kent Institute of Art & Design and now UCA Rochester) influenced a "vibrant art, poetry and music scene."

History
Of Medway musicians, the best known is Billy Childish (from Chatham) who formed punk band The Pop Rivets in the late 1970s, and later formed Thee Milkshakes, Thee Mighty Caesars, Thee Headcoats, The Buff Medways, The Musicians of the British Empire and The Chatham Singers, among others. His inspiration has led to many other bands forming who now have a worldwide cult following. Other notable bands include The Prisoners, The Dentists, The Claim and Thee Headcoatees. The music often draws heavily on the tradition of garage/punk/rock'n roll/raw-blues music from the 1950s and 1960s, hence references to the "Medway Delta". Records have been released on Big Beat, Media Burn and other small indie labels, as well as Childish's own Hangman Records and Hangman's Daughter, and latterly Damaged Goods Records.
There has also been an accompanying, though not so well known, poetry scene, started by The Medway Poets in the late 1970s; Childish was a member of this group. There is also a crossover into art with the Stuckists art group.

The music scene in Medway continued to thrive beyond the turn of the Millennium, with many bands (see below) based in the Towns. A large selection of recordings from this period is available to enjoy via The Medway Scene (Post 2000) project hosted at Internet Archive.

Bands
This list is incomplete

A
Abinger Drive
Acker & The Nice Boys
Antmonkey
Airhead
Allfather
All Flags Burn	
All the Flesh	
Alvin Purple
The Ambience		
Andy Pandys	
Archie Wah Wahs
Armitage Shanks
The Accursed
Ascend To Glory
Audrey, Start The Revolution
Auntie Vegetable
Autumn Venture
Avokan

B
Bad Taxidermy
Balance Lost
Bassbreakz FM
The Baron Von Marlon	
Bear vs Manero
Bela Lugosi Blues
Better Weather
The Beatles (Yellow Submarine)
Between the Eyes
The Big Three
Black Light Brigade
Black Lion Courtiers
Blind Lemon Pie	
Bluevoid
Bonsai Reservoir	
Brahma Bums
The Bresslaws
Brigadier Ambrose
Bring The Ruckus
The Bristols
Broken Banjo
The Buff Medways
The Blue Mantras

C
Calling Nova
Cakewalk
capitalH
Carpetburn
CarCrashTelevision
Cerulean Echoes
Cherubs
Chevouge
ChickenShit Blues Band
The Chatham Singers
Billy Childish and the Blackhands
Christlike Mints
The Claim
The Clockwork Spiders
Congress
Cracked Actors
Lupen Crook
Crustaceans (The)
Crybaby Special	
Crystal Tips & Alastair
CTMF
Thee Cuss Words

D
The Daggermen
Graham Day and the Forefathers
Graham Day and the Gaolers
Dead Kaczynski
Death Awaits Us
The Deccas	
Delayed Experience
The Delmonas
The Dentists		
Dirtie Bertie
Dirty Vibes
The Discords
Drawstring
Dresden Style
The Drunken Popes
Dumb Angel

E
The Earls of Suave
The Effected
Eleusia
Envy
Esther Kane
Exoskeletons

F
Feed the Rhino
Five Days Time
Floreat
The Flowing
The Flying Isaacs	
Fortune West
Footprints on the Ceiling
Frau Pouch
From Fags To Niggers

G
Galileo 7
Gash
The Germans
Get Rekt
Gin
Giraffe	
Godsends
G-Pid		
Groovy Uncle
The Godless Reds
The Grand Merci
The Gruff Men

H
The Hamelins
Thee Headcoatees
Thee Headcoats	
Heaven Sent
Heavy Mass Driver
The Herbs
The Hiding Place
Hold Your Fire
Houdini
Hypnotic Eye

J
Jack Gedge
James Doyle
The James Taylor Quartet
Johnny & the Bandits
Josh Carson
Joy Events

K
Karma
Jack Ketch and the Crowmen
Kid Harpoon
Kids Unique
KILL RPNZL
The Kravin' "A"s
Kris Dollimore

L
Len Bright Combo	
The Len Price 3	
Let Our Enemies Beware
The Long Weekend
Loud Sounds Dept
The Lovedays

Love Reptiles

M
The Masonics
Men from Memphis
mexicoFALLZ
Mickey & The Milkshakes
Thee Mighty Caesars
The Milkshakes	
Millions of Brazilians
The Mindreaders
Sexton Ming
The Musicians of the British Empire

N
Naked
Near Ruin
Needs Must	

The New	
Night Shift
Niltones
Nine Days to No One
Nobby and the balloon pilots 
Nutty Gig

O
The Ovines

One Day Elliot

Opus Trees

The Only Sun		

Orphan

The Objectors

P
Paperfriend
Pandora
Penthouse
Petburger
Petts
Phineas Fogg
Pity Party	
Planet Mushroom
Point IV
The Pop Rivets	
Power in Motion
The Pressure
The Prime Movers
The Prisoners	
The Product
Punching Swans
Pure Joy
Punyfish
Professional Biscuit Thief

Q
Quad Riot

R
The Reg Varney Trio	
Red Light
Restoring Order
Robert Underwater
Rocking Richard and Whistling Vic Templar

Racket Boyz

S
Saracen
Saturday Sunset
Scarecrow Asylum
Science Noodles	
Second Sun	
Sergeants' Mess
Silence Remains
Silesia
The Singing Loins
Slaves 
Smile Wide
The Solarflares
The Spangalitos
Sparrows
Thee Spartan Dreggs
The Sputniks
The Stabilisers
The Stormkings	
Story Books
The Strookas		
Stuart Turner
Sulphate
Sworn to Secrecy
The Syndromes

T
Tape Error
That Massive Bereavement
The Bluesmothers with Seven String Les
Theatre Royal
These Guilty Men
The Tinned Tomatoes 
Timmy Tremolo 
Things That Blink
The Men With The Golden Gonads
ThePARADE
Together, We Fight
Touch of Red
The Sulphur Scrubs
The Tour
The Trainset
Take A Stand
Turtle Circles

U
Underground Heroes
Univited Guests
Unknown Impulse	
UpCDownCLeftCRightCABC+Start

V
The Vandebilts
The Vermin Poets
Vlks

W
WhiteDevilWhiteDevil
White Heat
The William Loveday Intention
Wiremother
The Wild
Wipeout
Wooden Dogs

Y
Ye Ascoynes D'Ascoynes

Z
Zen Bones
The Zac Schulze Gang

Notable musicians
Holly Golightly

Medway Music Archived 
The Medway Scene (Post 2000)

Selected discography
V/A - Medway Powerhouse, Vol One (LP) Hangman, 1987
V/A - Medway Powerhouse, Vol Two (LP) Hangman, 1987
V/A - Medway Powerhouse, Vol Three (LP) Hangman, 1988
V/A - Medway Powerhouse, Vol Four (LP) Hangman, 1989

Further reading
Collins, Bob and Snowball, Ian The Kids Are All Square: Medway Punk and Beyond 1977-1985, Countdown Books, 2014.
Holling, Saskia Girlsville: The Story of The Delmonas & Thee Headcoatees, Spinout Publications, 2021.
Morris, Stephen H. Do It Yourself: A History of Music in Medway, Cultured Llama, 2015.

References

Medway
Garage rock
English styles of music
Music scenes
Culture in Kent